Collado may refer to:

People
Adrià Collado (born 1972), Spanish actor
Álex Collado (born 1999), Spanish footballer
Alexei Collado (born 1988), Cuban professional boxer
Armando Collado (born 1985), Salvadoran-born Nicaraguan footballer
Beatriz Collado Lara (born 1959), Mexican politician
Berta Collado (born 1979), Spanish TV presenter and journalist
Carlos Collado (born 1938), Spanish politician
David Collado (born 1975), Dominican politician and businessman
Diego Collado (died 1638), Spanish Christian missionary
Diego Collado (born 2001), Spanish footballer
Norberto Collado Abreu (1921–2008), Cuban captain of the yacht that ferried Fidel Castro to Cuba from Mexico in 1956
Jesús Collado Alarcón (born 1979), Spanish paralympic swimmer
José Collado (born 1990), Spanish footballer
María Carmen Collado (born 1983), Spanish swimmer
María Collado Romero (1885–1968), Cuban journalist, poet, and feminist activist
Shirley Collado, American psychology professor and president of Ithaca College
Teresita Collado (born 1971), Guatemalan race walker
Victoria Collado, Cuban-American director
Yarisley Collado (born 1985), Cuban discus thrower

Places
Collado (Cáceres), municipality in the province of Cáceres, Extremadura, Spain
Collado de Contreras, municipality in the province of Ávila, Castile and León, Spain
Collado del Mirón, municipality in the province of Ávila, Castile and León, Spain
Collado Hermoso, municipality in the province of Segovia, Castile and León, Spain
Collado Mediano, municipality in the Community of Madrid, Spain
Collado Villalba, municipality in the Community of Madrid, Spain
Hoyos del Collado, municipality in the province of Ávila, Castile and León, Spain
Santiago del Collado, municipality in the province of Ávila, Castile and León, Spain

Other uses
El Collado Formation, geological formation in Cuenca, Spain whose strata date back to the Early Cretaceous
CB Collado Villalba, defunct basketball team based in Collado Villalba, Madrid
CH Collado Villalba, ice hockey team based in Collado Villalba, Madrid
CU Collado Villalba, football team based in Collado Villalba, Madrid